Teratojana is a monotypic moth genus in the family Eupterotidae. Its single species, Teratojana flavina, was found in the former Katanga Province of the Democratic Republic of the Congo. Both the genus and species were first described by Erich Martin Hering in 1937.

References

Moths described in 1937
Eupterotinae
Monotypic moth genera